Marina di Campo Airport  is the airport of the Italian island of Elba, located in the village of La Pila, in Marina di Campo. It is also known as Teseo Tesei Airport. It is the third airport of Tuscany in terms of passengers after Pisa International Airport and Florence Airport. The airport serves as a focus city of Silver Air, which is currently the only airline operating regularly from the airport.

History

Opened as a grass airstrip in 1963, the airport was taken over by Milan-based company Transair in 1966 and was developed to handle commercial traffic, with regional airline Transavio flying Britten-Norman Islanders and Piaggio P.166 aircraft to Pisa, Milan and Florence, although a tarmac runway was not opened until 1991. Transavio folded in 1990, but several other regional airlines including InterSky, Silver Air and Air Alps started operations in the following years. A new terminal was opened in 2013, with the old building remaining as a cafeteria, shopping centre and offices.

Airlines and destinations
The following airlines offers scheduled services from and to Marina di Campo:

Statistics

References

External links
 Official website
 

Airports in Italy
Transport in Tuscany
Elba
Buildings and structures in Tuscany
Campo nell'Elba